Bathurst Harbour is a shallow bay located in the south west region of Tasmania, Australia. Bathurst Harbour is contained within the Port Davey/Bathurst Harbour Marine Nature Reserve, and the Southwest National Park, part of the Tasmanian Wilderness World Heritage Area.

The harbour is connected by the narrow -long Bathurst Channel to Port Davey, and then water flows into the Southern Ocean. Like most estuarine systems in southwest Tasmania, the water is stained a deep red-brown due to tannin leached from buttongrass and adjacent heathland.

Features and location

Bathurst Harbour is a large, rectangular, almost landlocked body of water located in the southwest corner of Tasmania. The harbour is surrounded by low-lying alluvial plains with mountain ranges running along the western and eastern shores. The North River, Old River, Ray River and Melaleuca Creek all drain into the harbour either directly or into one of the many offshoot bays and inlets connected to the harbour.

Almost all of the harbour is navigable by sailing vessels with no submerged rocks or navigational hazards except for a small area around Black Swan Island at Old Bay in the harbours north. As with almost all of the estuarine system including the Bathurst Channel, the seabed falls sharply from the shore before hitting the level floor of the harbour which forms a gently sloping basin of mud and gravel with a maximum depth of  near Dixon Island. The true deepest point in the harbour is where the three channels meet between Platypus Point and Nixon Point which reaches  due to the dredging action of the tide.

Bathurst Harbour, like the rest of the Bathurst Channel, is a ria formation caused by the inundation of a large valley and its associated alluvial plains. The glacially carved landscape of the region has resulted in the shape of the estuarine system being greatly different to other ria formations around Tasmania such as the Derwent Estuary, instead bearing close resemblance to artificial impoundments like Lake Pedder,  to the north.

Bathurst Harbour is one of only two places in the world where the Maugean Skate, endemic to Tasmania, has been reported from. The main population is found in similar habitats in Macquarie Harbour to the north.

Settlement
The land around the harbour is unpopulated with little infrastructure. Most buildings and structures in the vicinity of the harbour are located at Melaleuca which supports an airstrip, several light structures, boat moorings and remains from the tin mines in the early 1900s. A mining department camp was formerly located at Woureddy Bay on Melaleuca Creek and the homestead "Claytons Corner" is located at the mouth of Melaleuca Creek on Forest Lagoon which includes a timber jetty. At present the region has no permanent population, but has in time had a number reclusive inhabitants.

Access
Bathurst Harbour has no vehicular access of any kind. Access is instead provided by either boat, air or walking. The only marine access to the harbour is via the Bathurst Channel from Port Davey. Two walking tracks, South Coast Track and the Port Davey Track, provide land access via either Cockle Creek or Scotts Peak Dam. An airstrip at Melaleuca gives the only aerial access to the region and is in turn connected to the main walking tracks.

See also

Macquarie Harbour
 Port Davey

References

Further reading

External links

 
 

South West Tasmania
Ports and harbours of Tasmania
Bays of Tasmania